Paisley East  was an unopened railway station in Paisley, Renfrewshire, Scotland.

History 
The station was originally part of the Paisley and Barrhead District Railway. The line was opened in 1897 and used for freight until the 1960s but none of the stations opened for passenger travel.

As can be seen on the linked map,  it was situated on the north side of Glasgow Road on the site of what became the Kelburn cinema, now the Kelburn Retirement Flats near the Sherwood Church. From the station to Seedhill Road, the line ran down Lacy Street along a very high wall. The station was first turned into a garage  then demolished in 1928. However, the branch continued into Paisley East goods at Cecil Street crossing Lacy Street at street level. The branch from Blackbyres junction to Paisley East goods closed on 31 December 1960.

The location of the station and the goods yard can be fixed today (as of 2009) because John Lyon's coal shop was still there (at 52 Glasgow Road) with a lion sculpture above the entrance. The shop is now a hairdresser's salon.  The station was directly opposite at the other side of Glasgow Road.

A rail tour operated by the Stephenson Locomotive Society on 1 September 1951. started at Paisley East Goods at Cecil Street and made its way to Barrhead South.

See also

References

Notes

Sources 
 
 
 Canadian National Magazine By Canadian National Railways V. 40, no. 12 (January  1955)
 
 Smith, W.A.C. and Anderson, P. An illustrated history of Glasgow's railways Irwell Press 1993
 
 The Railway Magazine November 1951 issue
 Dedicated web page
 RAILSCOT on Paisley and Barrhead District Railway
 Paisley East station on navigable OS map

Disused railway stations in Renfrewshire
Unbuilt railway stations in the United Kingdom
Buildings and structures in Paisley, Renfrewshire
Transport in Paisley, Renfrewshire